Imani Trishawn McGee-Stafford (born October 11, 1994) is an American professional basketball player. She played college basketball for University of Texas at Austin.

College

In 2015, while at Texas, McGee-Stafford was awarded the Honda Inspiration Award which is given to a collegiate athlete "who has overcome hardship and was able to return to play at the collegiate level". She grew up in a challenging home environment, but overcame the challenge and became a voice for others.

Texas statistics
Source

Professional career

WNBA
McGee-Stafford was drafted 10th overall by the Chicago Sky in the 2016 WNBA Draft. In her rookie season, she was ranked seventh in the league in blocks per game and was named to the WNBA All-Rookie Team. In her first playoff game, she broke the WNBA playoff rookie record for blocks in a game with 6. Midway through the 2017 season, McGee-Stafford was traded to the Atlanta Dream along with teammate Tamera Young in exchange for Jordan Hooper and a first-round draft pick. She continued on with Atlanta in 2018 before joining the Dallas Wings for the 2019 season.

Overseas
In December 2016, McGee-Stafford moved to Israel to play for Bnot Hertzeliya. In 16 games during the 2016–17 season, she averaged 14.0 points, 10.8 rebounds, 1.1 assists, 1.1 steals and 2.6 blocks per game. Between November and December 2017, she played in China for Beijing Great Wall of the Women's Chinese Basketball Association. She returned to China a year later, where she played for the Liaoning Flying Eagles between October and November 2018. In February 2019, she had a four-game stint in Turkey with Adana Basketbol.

On June 13, 2019, McGee-Stafford signed with the Perth Lynx in Australia for the 2019–20 WNBL season.

WNBA career statistics

Regular season

|-
| style="text-align:left;"| 
| style="text-align:left;"| Chicago
||31||16||18.9||.554||.000||.660||5.6||0.6||0.6||1.3||0.9||6.7
|-
| style="text-align:left;"| *
| style="text-align:left;"| Chicago
||22||4||15.5||.444||.333||.706||4.4||0.5||0.4||0.8||1.0||4.6
|-
| style="text-align:left;"| *
| style="text-align:left;"| Atlanta
||10||0||9.2||.542||.000||.500||2.9||0.2||0.1||0.7||0.3||2.9
|-
| style="text-align:left;"| 
| style="text-align:left;"| Total
||32||4||13.5||.463||.333||.652||3.9||0.4||0.3||0.8||0.8||4.1
|-
| style="text-align:left;"| Career
| style="text-align:left;"|2 years, 2 teams
| 63 || 20 || 16.2 || .514 || .333 || .658 || 4.8 || 0.5 || 0.4 || 1.0 || 0.8 || 5.3

Playoffs

|-
| style="text-align:left;"| 2016
| style="text-align:left;"| Chicago
||5||5||20.4||.500||.000||.600||8.2||0.8||0.0||2.0||1.0||8.4
|-
| style="text-align:left;"| Career
| style="text-align:left;"|1 year, 1 team
||5||5||20.4||.500||.000||.600||8.2||0.8||0.0||2.0||1.0||8.4

Personal life
McGee-Stafford was married to former Texas Longhorns football player Paul Boyette Jr. in 2015, but the couple divorced in 2017. She is the daughter of former WNBA player Pamela McGee, the younger maternal half-sister of current NBA player JaVale McGee, and a cousin of NFL player Jarron Gilbert. She also appeared on Let's Make a Deal with her grandmother on March 8, 2018 and received a pair of scooters. In the spring of 2020, she announced that she is stepping away for the next two WNBA seasons to pursue a Juris Doctor degree from Southwestern Law School in Los Angeles.

References

External links
Texas Longhorns bio

1994 births
Living people
African-American basketball players
American expatriate basketball people in Australia
American expatriate basketball people in China
American expatriate basketball people in Israel
American expatriate basketball people in Turkey
American women's basketball players
Atlanta Dream players
Basketball players from Los Angeles
Beijing Great Wall players
Centers (basketball)
Chicago Sky draft picks
Chicago Sky players
Dallas Wings players
Liaoning Flying Eagles players
McDonald's High School All-Americans
Perth Lynx players
Texas Longhorns women's basketball players
21st-century African-American sportspeople
21st-century African-American women